The Chemist is a four-piece alternative rock music group from Perth, Western Australia formed in 2007.

History
The Chemist formed when all four members met studying music at university. The Chemist's first gig was a heat in the prestigious Next Big Thing Competition. They won their heat and ended up runners-up in the entire competition.

They've since played at the Big Day Out, Splendor in the Grass, Southbound, received significant airplay on Triple J, worked with Luke Steele of the Sleepy Jackson and supported Silversun Pickups, Robert Forster, Boy & Bear, Hungry Kids of Hungary, The Beautiful Girls, End of Fashion, Birds of Tokyo and Sugar Army.

In 2013, The Chemist signed to Create/Control and released their debut album Ballet In The Badlands on March 22. The album was given 4/5 stars by Rolling Stone magazine.

Music style
The Chemist play a unique brand of blues infused indie swamp rock, drawing influence from artists such as Tom Waits, Bob Dylan, The Walkmen, The Beach Boys, Beck & many more.

Personnel
 Ben Witt – lead vocals, lead guitar, keyboard (2007–present)
 Elliot Smith – drums (2007-2012)
Chris Wright: drums (2012–present)
 James Ireland – keyboard (2007–present)
 Hamish Rahn – bass (2007–present)

Discography

Albums

Extended Plays

References

External links

 
 The Chemist interview in Reverb magazine (November 2010)

Western Australian musical groups
Musical groups established in 2007